The Almălău is a right tributary of the Danube in Romania. It passes through Lake Bugeac and flows into the Danube near Galița.

References

Rivers of Romania
Rivers of Constanța County